Lo-fi photography ("lo-fi" meaning low-fidelity, referring to "any process which fails to achieve the accuracy and 'transparency'") refers to unconventional photographic practices, chosen for aesthetics, which give an impression of low quality. Popular techniques include the use of toy cameras or pinhole cameras, for their distinctive stylistic effects. It can be considered a reaction to the perceived ease of creating technically perfect photos in the digital age. Some emphasize a return to film, while others use digital technology to accomplish the same effects. Low-fidelity photography has also been commonly linked with lo-fi music as well.

Details 

Lo-fi photography uses film or digital photography techniques to create more of a soft, unusual look to photos compared to the crisp and high definition photographs that standard photography aims to provide. These lo-fi images can be any combination of distorted, soft, hazy, under/over exposed and in any way unusual. Often, creating these images is unpredictable and the final image may differ significantly than what the photographer intends. Lo-fi photography does not seek perfection; instead it revels in the unpredictable nature of the world and of the camera. For instance, light leaks, vignetting, and incorrect exposure can be sought-after if it helps the photographer achieve their desired effect. Lo-fi allows the photographer to take photographs without thinking and then choose the ones they like. This is what makes lo-fi photography enjoyable. 
Creating lo-fi photography is also cheap and can be done with any low mega-pixel camera, or any cheap film camera. Toy cameras or disposable cameras can be used. This is especially good for traveling because it is cheap to replace if broken or lost. However, there are specific cameras for purchase that can be used to create lo-fi photography. 
Since it is a low cost, minimal training type of photography, it is no surprise that lo-fi photography was discovered more prominently through Instagram. However, the low budget cameras and lack of needed equipment make it an easy type of photography to produce for up and coming photographers looking for an outlet. This style of photography is less of a straight edge photography style, and more of an art style, making the images taken hard to place in a timeline, with no other use other than to appeal to the eye. The clouded lens is reminiscent of art styles that many painters have used in their works, and many people are drawn in by the similarities of the photography to hand-drawn art forms.

See also 
 Toy camera
 Pinhole camera
 Instant camera
 Redscale
 Cross processing
 Sprocket hole photography
 Outsider Art

References

Photography by genre